Svetozar Andrejević (Serbian Cyrillic: Светозар Андрејевић; Pozega, 1839 – Kragujevac, 23 March 1900) was a Serbian merchant, philanthropist, and member of Beogradske Trgovačke Omladine (Belgrade Merchant Youth).

Born in Pozega, Svetozar Andrejević is best remembered as a Kragujevac merchant who bequeathed a large piece of real estate at "Ilina Voda" to local district school boards for "their pleasure from now to eternity" -- za večito uživanje. Eco Park "Ilina Voda" is now a legacy of Svetozar Andrejević, established in 1900. There is a fountain with a small waterfall, five mini lakes connected by a small stream. There is also small zoo with about 100 animals, mostly domestic, and a garden with various types of trees characteristic of Šumadija. The curiosity in the park is the largest sculpture of Easter eggs ( high) in Europe and the second in the world; made from recycled metal, set in 2004.

Furthermore, the revenues from houses and three shops in Kragujevac he left to a foundation with the aim to build an academy with a dormitory to house, feed and educate poor children and orphans.

Sources
Spomenica Beogradske Trgovačke Omladine 1880-1930, Belgrade, 1931.

References

1839 births
1900 deaths